Abarth 2000 Sport is an iconic Italian mid-engined racing car which won its class at the 1000 km of Monza in 1971 and finished 11th overall. It was homologated for FIA Group 4 on 1 April 1969 with homologation number 252, and participated in a number of car races from 1969 to 1973. At least 50 cars were constructed.

Popular culture 
In the 1975 stop motion-animated film The Pinchcliffe Grand Prix, the racing car of Heinrich von Schnellfahrer is based on the Abarth 2000, upgraded with amongst others a larger rear wing and engine.

References 

Abarth vehicles
Cars of Italy
Mid-engined cars